The Minister for Building Materials and Minister for Secondary Industries was a ministry in the government of New South Wales, with the principal responsibility being the development, availability, production and standard of building materials particularly bricks, tiles and baths. It was established in the second McGirr ministry in May 1947, carved out of the responsibilities of the Minister for Labour and Industry. Additional responsibility for the encouragement and regulation of manufacturing, referred to as secondary industries, were added in November 1947 and the title of the portfolio was amended to reflect the additional responsibilities in March 1948. The portfolio was abolished in the first Cahill ministry in 1952 and the responsibilities for building materials were returned to the Minister for Labour and Industry while Secondary Industries returned to the Premier.

Role and responsibilities
During World War II building controls had been exercised by the Commonwealth government. With post war reconstruction, control over building materials returned to the state governments. Controls continued to be necessary in the post-war environment to ensure that State planning priorities (including the demands of population growth) were achieved and scarce resources were allocated equitably. The controls introduced by the Building Operations and Building Materials Control Act 1946, included requiring consent for building operations except those exempted under the Act; preventing architects, builders, contractors and engineers from commencing buildings which were unauthorised, and requiring them to conform to any conditions placed on the building authorisation. Local Government powers to approve building applications were subject to the Act. Consent was required to use bricks except for purposes defined by the Act. Restrictions were placed on the supply of a range of other building materials. Inspectors could visit building sites and places where building materials were manufactured, stored, sold or distributed and require the production of relevant records. This was initially administered by the Building Materials Branch of the Department of Labour and Industry and timber distribution staff of the Forestry Commission. In June 1947 these staff were transferred to the new department of building materials. A technical branch was established to stimulate and develop the various activities allied to the building industry, and to ensure the training of skilled tradesmen to enable the State’s housing program to be achieved. The branch also controlled all building materials such as bricks, cement products, and timber. The various branches which had combined to create the Department were operationally restricted to coastal districts while the new department's responsibilities covered the entire State.

Bricks for example were not permitted to be used for the construction of fences or garages.

A secondary industries section had been established in the Premier's department in 1944 with responsibility for developing manufacturing industries and in 1945 transferred to the Department of Labour and Industry. The functions of the section were to keep the Department informed about development and decentralisation of secondary industries, to provide information, advice and assistance to those contemplating the establishment of new industries or the expansion and technical development existing industries in NSW. The Section was responsible for the development and progressive implementation of various plans for industrial development, contact with overseas industries, negotiation for the establishment of factories in Australia, and movement towards the more rational and economic grouping of inter-related industries. The Division worked co-operatively with Commonwealth and other NSW agencies concerned with the development and decentralisation of secondary industries, and maintained contact with manufacturers for the purposes of information exchange, fostering expansion and efficiency, and encouraging maximum employment.

On 4 November, 1947 the secondary industries division was transferred from the Premier's department to the Department of Building Materials in order to achieve co-ordination between industrial and housing development. Despite the additional responsibilities, the portfolio remained named Building Materials until June 1950 when it was renamed Minister for Secondary Industries and Minister for Building Materials.

On 15 August 1952 William Dickson resigned from the ministry and was elected President of the Legislative Council. The portfolio was abolished, with responsibility for secondary industries returning to the Premier, while building materials returned to the responsibility of the Minister for Labour and Industry. Manufacturing was next represented at a portfolio level as Minister for Industrial Development and Decentralisation.

List of ministers

References

Building Materials